Gate 4 is the name of the association that consists of many supporters groups of the Greek multi-sports club PAOK. The association has members from all over Greece and over the years has played an important role in the club's course influencing the club's decisions. They mostly wear black and white symbols and clothes, which are the colors of the club.

History

Background

PAOK always had great support from fans all over Greece. Before the foundation of Gate 4 there were various football supporters' clubs all around Greece. PAOK's first fan association was the club from Neapoli district of Thessaloniki, founded in 1963 and considered one of the oldest in Europe. Gate 4 officially founded on 25 September 1976, but operated unofficially from April of the same year, taking its name from the homonymous 4th gate of the Toumba Stadium, from where PAOK's hard-core fans watched the games. The association has over 120 groups in various parts of the world, in Greece, Cyprus, Australia, Belgium, United States, Germany, Sweden and Switzerland. The headquarters of the organization is the so-called "Low-ceilinged", located on 39, Palaion Patron Germanos street in Thessaloniki. 

Toumba Stadium, home stadium of PAOK Football Club, is infamous for its hostile atmosphere, a factor that led to the attribution of the Stadium as "The Black Hell". On high-profile encounters, when the players walk out of the tunnel, the song Hells Bells by AC/DC is heard from the stadium's speakers. Also, one of the biggest banners in the world was created by Michaniona fan club. 

Over the years, Gate 4 has openly expressing opposition to some of the club's managements. The most famous was the dispute with former club's owner Thomas Voulinos. This dispute intensified on 1 October 1992, when PAOK faced Paris Saint-Germain for the UEFA Cup. The match was abandoned due to crowd violence and PAOK were punished with a two-year ban from all European competitions by the UEFA disciplinary committee. The sentence was later reduced to one year. Voulinos blamed the leader of Gate 4, Antonis Kladas, of being the instigate of the riots, whom he sued him. Finally, after several years, Kladas was acquitted in Greek courts.

No 12 jersey is dedicated to the fans, the symbolic 12th man on the pitch. It was permanently retired by the club on 16 August 2000.

On 24 February 2022, during the match against Midtjylland for the UEFA Europa Conference League, a banner raised for 30 minutes, expressing solidarity with the accused murderers of the 19 years old supporter of rival team Aris, Alkis Kampanos. This act was criticized by most of PAOK supporters, but also by the management of the club, which issued an official statement condemning the incident.

Vale of Tempe tragedy 

On 3 October 1999, some 3,000 PAOK fans attended the Olympic Stadium of Athens for an away match against Panathinaikos for the Greek League. On its way back to Thessaloniki, the double-decker bus of the fan club of Kordelio district collided with a truck and fell into a ditch in the Vale of Tempe, Thessaly. The aftermath of the bus crash was devastating. Six PAOK fans lost their lives (Kyriakos Lazaridis, Christina Tziova, Anastasios Themelis, Charalampos Zapounidis, Georgios Ganatsios, Dimitris Andreadakis) and many others were injured. A roadside memorial, which is engraved with the names of the 6 people who died in the accident, was erected at the site of the crash bearing the following inscription: "Their love for PAOK brought them here, left them here and went beyond".

Friendships 

The group holds a very strong brotherhood with Grobari, the organized supporters group of the Serbian football club Partizan Belgrade. On many occasions, fans from both clubs traveled to watch each other's games. They also maintain good relations with the fans of Russian CSKA Moscow. 

PAOK fans also have good relations with the fans of OFI Crete, a friendship that started in October 1987 when OFI faced Atalanta for the UEFA Cup Winners' Cup at Toumba Stadium and numerous PAOK fans supported the Cretans.

Rivalries 

The rivalry between Olympiacos and PAOK, is long-standing, emerging in the 1960s, when Olympiacos unsuccessfully tried to acquire Giorgos Koudas from PAOK, approaching him directly without going into a negotiation with his club.

A long-time rivalry also exists between PAOK and local rivals Aris.

Panathinaikos and AEK, Athens' two big clubs, are also considered major rivals.

References 

PAOK
Greek association football supporters' associations
Ultras groups
1976 establishments in Greece